is a 1949 black-and-white Japanese film directed by Tadashi Imai. It is based on Yōjirō Ishizaka's novel of the same name, which was first published in serialised form in 1947.

Plot
After defending Shinko, student at a rural girls' high school, for seeing a young man from the village, teacher Yukiko, who has just been transferred from Tokyo, finds herself in opposition to the conservative faculty and villagers.

Cast

Production and legacy
Aoi sanmyaku was released in two parts, part one on July 19, 1949, part two one week later, and was highly successful both with the audience and the critics.

The film's popular theme song theme was sung by Ichiro Fujiyama and Mitsue Nara. Ishizaka's novel was adapted again in 1957, 1975 and 1988.

Reception 
The Japanese filmmaker Akira Kurosawa cited this movie as one of his 100 favorite films.

References

External links

Japanese black-and-white films
1949 films
1949 drama films
1949 romantic drama films
Japanese romantic drama films
Films directed by Imai Tadashi
Films scored by Ryōichi Hattori